Trochoidea cucullus  is a species of air-breathing land snail, a terrestrial pulmonate gastropod mollusk in the family Geomitridae, the hairy snails and their allies. 
Subspecies
 Trochoidea cucullus cucullus (E. von Martens, 1875)
 Trochoidea cucullus despotti (Soós, 1933)
 Trochoidea cucullus soosi Beckmann, 2003

Distribution

This species occurs on Malta.

References

 Bank, R. A.; Neubert, E. (2017). Checklist of the land and freshwater Gastropoda of Europe. Last update: July 16th, 2017

Trochoidea (genus)
Gastropods described in 1873